Romualdo Tancredi, O.S.B. (1637–1694) was a Roman Catholic prelate who served as Bishop of Montalcino (1688–1694).

Biography
Romualdo Tancredi was born on 7 July 1637 in Siena, Italy and ordained a priest in the Order of Saint Benedict.
On 9 August 1688, he was appointed during the papacy of Pope Innocent XI as Bishop of Montalcino.
On 22 August 1688, he was consecrated bishop by Savo Millini, Bishop of Orvieto, with Pietro Francesco Orsini de Gravina, Archbishop of Benevento, and Gianfrancesco Riccamonti, Bishop of Cervia, serving as co-consecrators. 
He served as  Bishop of Montalcino until his death in December 1694.

References

External links and additional sources
 (for Chronology of Bishops) 
 (for Chronology of Bishops) 

17th-century Italian Roman Catholic bishops
Bishops appointed by Pope Innocent XI
1637 births
1694 deaths
Benedictine bishops